Mitchell Todd (15 March 1991 – 15 August 2012) was a Scottish rugby union player who played at lock for Nottingham. Todd died following a car accident near Normanton-on-the-Wolds on 15 August 2012. Nottingham released a statement confirming his death.

He completed a degree in Sports Therapy at the University of Coventry and previously played for Leicester Lions.

References

External links
Nottingham profile

1991 births
2012 deaths
Alumni of Coventry University
Rugby union players from Solihull
Scottish rugby union players
Rugby union locks
Road incident deaths in England